The Everglades Headwaters National Wildlife Refuge and Conservation Area, created in 2012, the newest addition and 556th unit of the United States National Wildlife Refuge (NWR) System, began with  donated to the conservation effort as part of the Obama administration's America's Great Outdoors Initiative.

Management
The NWR is managed by the Everglades Headwaters National Wildlife Refuge Complex that also includes the Pelican Island NWR, Lake Wales Ridge National Wildlife Refuge, and the Archie Carr NWR.

Description
Ken Salazar announced the creation of the Everglades Headwaters National Wildlife Refuge and Conservation Area, that is, and will be, a large area of land south of Orlando and to the north of Lake Okeechobee. The original donation was 10 acres but is targeted for 50,000 acres. Florida pioneered Rural and Family Lands Protection Act provides funding for easements on thousands of acres of working ranches in the Everglades system, as part of the Everglades restoration, targeted to be 100,000 acres. Another new NWR is also planned for the area between the Florida Panther National Wildlife Refuge in the Southwest and the new Everglades Headwaters NWR.

Added land
The added land and leases were provided by a Land and Water Conservation Fund (LWCF) of $12.5 million used by the U.S. Fish and Wildlife Service. These added conservation easements, fee acquisitions, and purchases will ensure protection for gopher tortoise and the endangered Florida grasshopper sparrow.

Flora
There is a diverse habitat, ranging from "Pine Flatwoods" that is habitat range for the Florida panther and Florida black bear, "Xeric Oak Scrub" community that includes myrtle oak, Chapman's oak, sand-live oak, scrub holly, scrub plum, scrub hickory, rosemary, and saw palmetto, and the Florida Ziziphus, habitat for the sand skink. The "Freshwater Marsh and Wet Prairie" includes habitat such as the pickerel weed, sawgrass, maidencane, arrowhead, fire flag, cattail, spike rush, bulrush, white water lily, water shield, and various other sedges

Endangered species
The Florida jujube listed as federally endangered, pygmy fringetree listed as endangered, Florida sand skink, Eastern Indigo Snake, Sand Pine, Scrub Beargrass, and Scrub Blazing Star.

Future plans
Long-range plans include purchasing land where practical or conservation easements or fee acquisitions, to restore the headwater flow from central Florida down to the Florida Everglades. Widening of canals connecting Lake Kissimmee to Lake Hatchineha, C-37 from 70 to 90 feet, and between Lake Hatchineha and Lake Cypress, C-36 from 48 to 60 feet. Certain levees will be degraded to accommodate water flow. Populated areas will have to have sewage modifications.

References

National Wildlife Refuges in Florida
Protected areas of Hardee County, Florida
Protected areas of Highlands County, Florida
Protected areas of Polk County, Florida
Protected areas established in 2012
Wetlands of Florida
Landforms of Hardee County, Florida
Landforms of Highlands County, Florida
Landforms of Polk County, Florida
2012 establishments in Florida